= 7/9 =

7/9 may refer to:

- July 9 (month-day date notation)
- September 7 (day-month date notation)
